The Polog Statistical Region (Albanian:Rajoni i Pollogut) is one of eight statistical regions of the Republic of North Macedonia. Polog, located in the northwestern part of the country, borders Albania and Kosovo. Internally, it borders the Southwestern and Skopje statistical regions.

Municipalities

Polog is divided into 9 municipalities:
 Bogovinje
 Brvenica
 Gostivar
 Jegunovce
 Mavrovo and Rostuša
 Tearce
 Tetovo
 Vrapčište
 Želino

Demographics

Population
The current population of the Polog statistical region is 304,125 citizens, according to the last population census in 2002.

Ethnicities
Polog is the only statistical region in North Macedonia where Macedonians are not the majority.

See also
Polog

Notes

References

Statistical regions of North Macedonia